The Philippine Senate Committee on Public Works is a standing committee of the Senate of the Philippines.

Jurisdiction 
According to the Rules of the Senate, the committee handles all matters relating to:

 Planning, construction, maintenance, improvement and repair of public buildings, highways, bridges, roads, ports, airports, harbors and parks;
 Drainage, flood control and protection
 Irrigation and water utilities

Members, 18th Congress 
Based on the Rules of the Senate, the Senate Committee on Public Works has 13 members.

The President Pro Tempore, the Majority Floor Leader, and the Minority Floor Leader are ex officio members.

Here are the members of the committee in the 18th Congress as of September 24, 2020:

Committee secretary: Ethel Hope Dignadice-Villaflor

See also 

 List of Philippine Senate committees

References 

Public Works
Infrastructure in the Philippines